DEC, dec or Dec may refer to:

Abbreviations, initialisms, acronyms 
 December, the 12th month and final month of the year in the Julian and Gregorian calendars
 Declination, a term from astronomy
 Diethylcarbamazine, an anti-parasite drug
 Diethyl carbonate, an organic solvent
 Diplome d’Études Collegiales, French name for Diploma of College Studies, a college studies diploma issued in Quebec
 Oratorical Declamation, an event in competitive debate
 Display Energy Certificate, a UK requirement to show a certificate rating energy performance in public buildings
 Direct energy conversion, a scheme for power extraction from nuclear fusion
 An abbreviation for decimal, for example in ASCII charts

Organizations 
 Delaware Electric Cooperative
 Department of Education and Communities (New South Wales), Australia
 Department of Environment and Conservation (New South Wales), Australia
 Department of Environment and Conservation (Western Australia), Australia
 New York State Department of Environmental Conservation, New York, United States
 Dheeraj and East Coast LLC, Dubai
 Digital Equipment Corporation, a defunct computer and technology company
 Disasters Emergency Committee, coordinates fifteen disaster relief charities in the United Kingdom
 Distance Education Council, former body for open and distance education, see Distant Education Bureau
 Dubai Economic Council, a policy-making body of the government of Dubai

People 
 Declan Donnelly (from Ant & Dec), a United Kingdom television presenter
 Francis E. Dec  (1926–1996), American outsider writer and lawyer

Places 
 Deč, a village in Serbia
 Decatur Airport, Decatur, Illinois (IATA airport code DEC)
 Derwent Entertainment Centre, an entertainment centre in Hobart, Australia
 Doncaster Education City, a development in South Yorkshire